Marie-Josephe Jean-Pierre (born 1 May 1975) is a Mauritian badminton player. She competed in three events at the 1996 Summer Olympics in Atlanta.

References

External links

1975 births
Living people
Mauritian female badminton players
Olympic badminton players of Mauritius
Badminton players at the 1996 Summer Olympics